Sakizō Yai (屋井 先蔵, January 13, 1864 - June 1, 1927) was a Japanese businessman and the inventor of a type of dry cell battery.

Life 
Sakizō Yai was born on January 13, 1864, at the house of Yai, to a samurai family in the Nagaoka Domain (currently Nagaoka, Niigata Prefecture). The Yai family was an upper class samurai family who held a property of more than 300 koku for generations, but at the age of six Sakizō's father died and the house went bankrupt. After this, his mother and his uncle took him over.

In 1885, Yai invented a continuous electric clock that ran on wet cell batteries at the age of 21. Electric clocks already existed, but they were to wind the power source spring with electricity, and that of Yai was a breakthrough in incorporating a self-made battery and running everything electrically. This continuous electric clock was recognized as the first electric patent in Japan in 1891.

In 1887, Yai was successful in inventing a dry cell electric battery. However, he could not apply for a patent immediately because he could not prepare the application fee for the patent, and the patent for the first dry battery in Japan was obtained by the electrician Ichisaburo Takahashi. Carl Gassner patented the dry cell battery in Germany and Helensen patented the dry cell battery in Denmark in 1888.

In 1893, the Tokyo Imperial University's seismograph was exhibited at the 1893 World's Columbian Exposition, and the pre-stored batteries used in it surprised the visitors.

In 1927, he suffered from gastric cancer and died suddenly of acute pneumonia on June 1 of the same year. He was 63 years old.

References 

Battery inventors
Japanese inventors
1864 births
1927 deaths
People of Meiji-period Japan
19th-century inventors